Thomas Johansson (born 1966) is a retired Swedish footballer. Johansson made 12 Allsvenskan appearances for Djurgården and scored 0 goals.

References

Swedish footballers
Djurgårdens IF Fotboll players
1966 births
Living people
Association footballers not categorized by position